Gideon Emery is an English actor and singer. He is best known for his role as Deucalion in Teen Wolf and for providing voice-over work in video games, television series and films.

Early life and education
Emery was born to Pauline, a competitive horse rider and Ashton, a management consultant. He has two half brothers, Matthew and Paul. Gideon also has three nieces, Chloe Emery, Rebecca Emery and Kate Emery. At the age of 4, his father moved the family to Johannesburg, South Africa. Emery kept himself amused by imitating characters from film and television. Early impersonations included Michael Jackson and Max from Hart to Hart. He returned to England during high school, briefly attending Reading Blue Coat School. But it was back in South Africa at St John's College where he cemented his love for acting, playing Dick Deadeye in the Gilbert & Sullivan musical H.M.S. Pinafore and winning Best Actor for the role of Mr. Glum in The Glums comedy sketch, "L'Engagement". After briefly considering a career in graphic art, he went on to study acting at the University of the Witwatersrand. Student roles included Salieri in Amadeus and Gregor in Steven Berkoff's adaption of Kafka's The Metamorphosis.

Personal life
On October 19, 2014, Emery married his wife, actress Autumn Withers at Santa Barbara, California. Emery currently lives in Los Angeles with his wife and their dog. In 2017, Emery and his wife revealed that they were expecting their first child together. On April 7, 2018, they welcomed their daughter, Mia Monroe Emery.

Career
In his third year of drama school, friend Ashley Callie was going to audition for Johannesburg's annual Christmas pantomime, directed by the award-winning Janice Honeyman. Emery was persuaded to go along and ended up being cast. He played a couple of characters, but impressed with his stand-up routine during a set change. As a result, fellow cast member, veteran actor Bill Flynn introduced him to his agent and his career was started. Around this time, he also began what was to become a prolific voice career. (He would later win a Gold Craft Award at the 2003 Loerie Advertising Awards) He played in a number of stand-up venues and established himself as character actor, often performing multiple roles within a single play, such as all the male roles in Mark Ravenhill's Sleeping Around and Tom, Leslie and Phyllis in A.R. Gurney's Sylvia.

He performed standup comedy on television and was a series regular on the sketch comedy show Not Quite Friday Night. He received the National Vita Award for Comedy for the role of Maloom in the play Heel Against the Head, once again alongside Bill Flynn and actor/playwright Paul Slabolepszy. Emery has also performed his own one-man plays, Thin Man Talking and The Great Glendini. For the latter, he recorded a jazz standards album, Standard Ease. He acted alongside the late Bill Flynn for a third and final time, playing Bernard to Flynn's Willy Loman in the award-winning Baxter Theatre production of Death of a Salesman.

 Thanks to his keen ear for accents, Emery found himself playing various roles in visiting British and American film and television productions. He soon decided that the screen was where he wanted to focus his attention. With most major projects casting their lead roles overseas, he decided it was time to explore more diverse opportunities. In late 2003, he moved to Los Angeles, where he has played memorable characters both on screen (Last Resort, Takers, Moonlight, Burn Notice) and for video games such as Final Fantasy XII, Vanquish, Dragon Age II and Street Fighter X Tekken. He is an in-demand motion capture performer and can be seen and heard in the games Call of Duty: Advanced Warfare, Battlefield 3 and Halo Wars 2, all of which also use his likeness. He has also narrated over 50 audiobooks.

Emery had a recurring role on the hit MTV series Teen Wolf as season three's main antagonist Deucalion, a blind but powerful Alpha werewolf who leads a pack consisting entirely of Alphas. Emery reprised the role in season five: "To prove not only to others, but also to himself, that Deucalion is capable of being true and noble." He would return once again for the final season of the show. He won multiple best actor awards for his role as Richard Pine in Bill Hanson's adaptation of Stephen King's Survivor Type. On the lighter side, Emery is the creator, director and star of E&N with Ed Neusbit, a comedic news parody show offering "all the news you never knew you needed". Other recurring roles include Daredevil, Shameless, Last Resort, Good Behavior and Scream: Resurrection. In 2020, Emery joined the cast of Netflix series Dash & Lily as Lily's father.

Filmography

Live-action roles

Film

Television

Theatre

Voice over roles

Film

Television

Video games

Audiobooks

Discography
Standard Ease (2011)

Awards
Best Actor Award – Survivor Type – Golden Egg Film Festival (2014, Winner)
Award of Merit: Leading Actor – Survivor Type – Best Shorts Competition (2014, Winner)
Award of Excellence: Leading Actor – Survivor Type – Accolade Competition (2013, Winner)
Best Actor in a Short Film – Survivor Type – Bare Bones International Film Festival (2012, Winner)
Best Actor Award – Survivor Type – Los Angeles International Underground Film Festival (2012, Winner)
Award of Merit – Sex Drive – Accolade Competition (2010, Winner)
Suspense/Thriller Award – The Price of Love and Other Stories – Audie Awards (2010, Nominee)
Supporting Performance in a Drama – Brothers in Arms: Hell's Highway – Videogame Awards (2008, Nominee)
Loerie Gold Craft Award: Radio VO – SABC: Wed-nes-day – Loeries Advertising Awards (2003, Winner)
Best Actor in a Comedy – Heel Against the Head – National Vita Awards (1995, Winner)

References

External links

 Official acting website
 Official voice over website
 
 Gideon Emery on Audible.com
 

Living people
Alumni of St John's College (Johannesburg)
Audiobook narrators
British expatriate male actors in the United States
British expatriates in South Africa
English expatriates in the United States
English impressionists (entertainers)
English jazz singers
English male film actors
British male jazz musicians
English male musical theatre actors
English male singers
English male stage actors
English male television actors
English male video game actors
English male voice actors
Male actors from Los Angeles
People educated at Reading Blue Coat School
People from Johannesburg
Singers from Los Angeles
University of the Witwatersrand alumni
20th-century English male actors
20th-century English singers
21st-century English male actors
20th-century English musicians
21st-century English singers
20th-century British male singers
21st-century British male singers
1972 births